Conleth Davey is a Northern Irish retired footballer who played in the North American Soccer League for Toronto Metros as a centre forward.

Personal life 
Davey's brothers Pat and Terry and son Hugh all became footballers.

Career statistics

Honours 
Dundalk

 League of Ireland: 1975–76
Leinster Cup: 1973–74

References

Association footballers from Northern Ireland
NIFL Premiership players
Association football forwards
Year of birth missing (living people)
People from Newry
Dundalk F.C. players
North American Soccer League (1968–1984) players
Toronto Blizzard (1971–1984) players
Northern Ireland amateur international footballers
Living people
Glenavon F.C. players

Coleraine F.C. players